The Delta Cultural Center in downtown Helena, Arkansas, is a cultural center and museum of the Department of Arkansas Heritage.  It is dedicated to preserving and interpreting the culture of the Arkansas Delta. They also partner with other cultural organizations to interpret different cultural elements.

The center consists of three buildings:

A Visitors Center which houses an interactive exhibition of Delta music including the King Biscuit Blues Festival and the broadcast facilities for King Biscuit Time which is the longest running blues radio program in the nation.
The Train Depot, a former Union Pacific station, at Natchez and Missouri Street, houses exhibits on the American Civil War in Helena including the 1863 Battle of Helena, Union occupation of the area, slave experiences, and women in Civil War Helena.  The Train Depot also has exhibits on the history of the Mississippi River including the Great Mississippi Flood of 1927 and exhibits on Delta agriculture and Native American history.  This c. 1915 Craftsman/Classical Revival building is listed on the National Register of Historic Places.

The Moore-Hornor House, at 323 Beech Street, is a red brick Greek Revival/Italianate-style home built in 1859, and is also listed on the National Register.  The back yard of the home saw fierce hand-to-hand fighting during the Battle of Helena in the Civil War.

See also
 National Register of Historic Places listings in Phillips County, Arkansas
 List of music museums

References

External links
 Delta Cultural Center website

1990 establishments in Arkansas
African-American museums in Arkansas
Arkansas Heritage Trails System
History museums in Arkansas
History of Arkansas
Music museums in Arkansas
Museums established in 1990
Museums in Helena, Arkansas
National Register of Historic Places in Phillips County, Arkansas
Railway stations on the National Register of Historic Places in Arkansas
Helena
Former railway stations in Arkansas